Camptodontus may refer to:
 Camptodontus (beetle), a genus of beetles in the family Carabidae
 an extinct genus of enantiornithine bird renamed Camptodontornis